Dyoma (Dim, also , Kügiźel) is a river in the Republic of Bashkortostan, Russia. It flows north and joins the Belaya at Ufa.

The Dyoma has its sources on the northern slopes of the Obshchy Syrt plateau at the border of Orenburg Oblast north of the south-flowing Salmysh branch of the Sakmara River. From there, it flows towards the northeast into Bashkortostan, where it forms a wide valley. Here, the river runs slowly, and is heavily meandering, particularly in its lower reaches before its confluence with the Belaya.

The town of Davlekanovo lies at the Dyoma, and the river's mouth is within the boundaries of the city of Ufa, in the township of Dyoma, named after the river.

References

Rivers of Bashkortostan